Tomthin Shija (English: My Mom & Me) is a 2017 Indian Meitei language film directed by Bobby Haobam, written by Binoranjan Oinam and produced by Geeta Konsam. The film features Maya Choudhury and Amar Mayanglambam in the titular roles. It was released on 23 September 2017 at MSFDS (Manipur State Film Development Society), Palace Compound, Imphal and Indrani Hall, Kakching. The movie was also premiered at Hindu College Auditorium, North Campus, University of Delhi, on 14 October 2017.

Cast
 Maya Choudhury as Dr. Ayingbi Shija, Tomthin's Mother
 Amar Mayanglambam as Tomthin Rajkumar
 Soma Laishram as Tomba
 Raju Nong as Tomthin's Father
 Idhou as Tomthin's Grandfather
 Heisnam Ongbi Indu as Tomthin's Grandmother
 Sagolsem Dhanamanjuri as Maibi
 Sweety Wahengbam as Thadoi
 Gurumayum Bonny as Fisherman (Cameo Appearance)
 Leishangthem Tonthoi as Fisherman's Wife (Cameo Appearance)

Accolades
Tomthin Shija won Best Cinematography and Best Costume Designer awards at the 7th Sahitya Seva Samiti Awards (SSS MANIFA) 2018. At the 11th Manipur State Film Awards 2018, Chakpram Rameshchandra (Idhou) won the Best Supporting Actor - Male and Biju Kshetri was conferred the Best Special Effect Award.

Soundtrack
Tony Aheibam composed the soundtrack for the film and Binoranjan Oinam wrote the lyrics. The songs are titled Nangdi Thajani and Waroude.

References

External links
 

2017 films
2010s Meitei-language films